Giovanni Antiga (July 29, 1878 – July 11, 1960) was an Italian organist and composer. He was born in Miane and died in Nice.

Notable works
Impressioni al Carmine (piccola suite)
Campane a festa
Presso una fontanella
Ninna Nanna
Raggi di luna sul mare
Campane di Roma
Contemplando un Crocifisso del Brustolon a S. Fior
Canto d'Amore
Piccola raccolta di impressioni giovanili
Riduzioni di composizioni classiche per le piccole mani
Sulla tomba di un eroe
La visione del Cadore
Le foglie d'autunno
Il canto del montanaro
La canzone nostalgica
Il tramonto del sole
Trot des cavaliers
Boite a musique
Le fontane di camurei 
Je t'amerai toujours 
Dance roustique
Il Piave (poema sinfonico)
Sulle rive del Piave 
Polonaise
Suonata per piano e violino
Tarantella napoletana
Ricordi di Spagna
Cinque pezzetti romantici
Exercices du meccanisme et de velocité

Italian composers
Italian male composers
Italian organists
Male organists
1878 births
1960 deaths